William Hill may refer to:

People

In government and politics
William Hill (Australian politician) (1866–1939), long-serving member of the Australian House of Representatives
William Hill (colonial administrator) (fl. 1630s), British colonial Proprietary Governor of the Province of Avalon, Newfoundland
William Hill (Iowa politician) (born 1930), American politician in the state of Iowa
William Hill (New South Wales politician) (1838–1919), member of the New South Wales Legislative Council
William Hill (Wisconsin politician), member of the Wisconsin State Assembly
William A. Hill (1864–1932), American judge in Colorado
William C. Hill (1917–1998), Vermont attorney and judge
William D. Hill (1833–1906), American politician; U.S. Representative from Ohio
William Davison Hill (1860–1944), farmer and political figure in Nova Scotia, Canada
William Henry Hill (New York politician) (1876–1972), American politician; U.S. Representative from New York
William Henry Hill (North Carolina politician) (1767–1809), American politician; U.S. Representative from North Carolina
William James Hill (1854–1922), Ontario construction contractor and political figure
William Luther Hill (1873–1951), American politician; U.S. Senator from Florida
William Noel-Hill, 3rd Baron Berwick (1773–1842), British peer
William S. Hill (1886–1972), American politician; U.S. Representative from Colorado
William U. Hill (born 1948), justice of the Wyoming Supreme Court

In military
William Lee Hill (1920-1981) Tuskegee Airman
William Lowell Hill (1855–1922), USN, U.S. Medal of Honor recipient
William P. T. Hill (1895–1965), United States Marine Corps general

In science
William Charles Osman Hill (1901–1975), British anatomist and primatologist
Bill Hill (geneticist) (born 1940), population geneticist

In sport
William Hill (British athlete) (1896–1958), British track and field athlete
William Hill (Hong Kong athlete) (1945–2020), Hong Kong track and field athlete
William Hill (sport shooter), Australian Olympic shooter
Bill Hill (baseball) (1874–1938), American Major League Baseball pitcher
Will Hill (born 1990), American football player
Bill Hill (American football) (born 1959), American football cornerback
William Hill (footballer, born 1920) (1920–1999), English footballer

In other fields
William Hill (architect) (1827–1889), English architect
William Hill (blacksmith), Scottish ironworker at the court of James V
William Hill (businessman) (1903–1971), founder of William Hill bookmakers
William Ebsworth Hill (1817–1895), London violin maker and founder of the firm W. E. Hill & Sons
William Lair Hill (1838–1924), American attorney, historian, and newspaper editor
William "Red" Hill Sr. (1888–1942), Canadian rescuer and Niagara Falls daredevil
Billy Hill (gangster) (1911–1984), London mobster also known as William Hill
Billie Ritchie (born William Hill; 1878–1921), Scottish comedian

Other uses
William Hill Estates, a winery owned by E & J Gallo Winery in Napa Valley, California
William Hill (bookmaker), a major chain of bookmakers in Britain; now a subsidiary of 888 Holdings
William Hill (This Is Us), a fictional character on the U.S. TV series This Is Us
William Hill & Sons (fl. 1800s), English organ maker
W.E. Hill & Sons (1880–1992), London luthier, antique string instruments and bow dealer
William Hill Sports Book of the Year, an annual British book award given British bookmakers William Hill plc

See also
Billy Hill (disambiguation)
Willie Hill (disambiguation)

Hill, William